St. Luke's Catholic Church is a historic Roman Catholic church at 508 W. Pine in Warren, Arkansas. It is attended from Holy Redeemer Church in El Dorado, in the Diocese of Little Rock.

The historic structure was built in 1907, following a simple L-shaped plan with Gothic Revival styling. The exterior is concrete blocks that have been treated to look like ashlar stone. It was originally built for the Episcopal Diocese of Arkansas and called St. Mary's Church, but it never had a large congregation, and services ended in the late 1920s. It was vacant until its purchase in 1948 by the Catholic Church, which named it St. Luke's.

The church was listed on the National Register of Historic Places in 1998.

See also
National Register of Historic Places listings in Bradley County, Arkansas

References

Churches in the Roman Catholic Diocese of Little Rock
Churches on the National Register of Historic Places in Arkansas
Gothic Revival church buildings in Arkansas
Roman Catholic churches completed in 1907
Churches in Bradley County, Arkansas
National Register of Historic Places in Bradley County, Arkansas
1948 establishments in Arkansas
20th-century Roman Catholic church buildings in the United States
Warren, Arkansas